is a Japanese footballer currently playing as a defender for Tokushima Vortis.

Career statistics

Club
.

Notes

References

External links

1997 births
Living people
Association football people from Aichi Prefecture
Hannan University alumni
Japanese footballers
Association football defenders
J1 League players
Nagoya Grampus players
Tokushima Vortis players